Adinda Cresheilla (born 29 January 1998) is an Indonesian model, actress, 2022 G20 Ambassador, and beauty pageant titleholder who was crowned Puteri Indonesia Pariwisata 2022. She is the first representative from East Java to be crowned Puteri Indonesia Pariwisata. She represented Indonesia at Miss Supranational 2022 in Poland where she placed as the 3rd Runner-up.

Early life and education 
Adinda Cresheilla was born on 29 January 1998 in Surabaya, East Java, Indonesia to a native Minahasan mother, Emma Sugiyono, and a Javanese father, Dodock Credenda Handogo. Her father and older brother are Extreme E kart racers. She completed her double degree program of Bachelor of Social Science from University of Indonesia and received a full scholarship in Bachelor of Arts (BA) in Communication from Deakin University, Australia. She graduated with summa cum-laude and became a valedictorian.

Career 

Cresheilla gained recognition as a model after being selected as a finalist for Wajah Femina and Gadis Sampul in 2016. Since then she appeared in Femina Magazine, Gadis Sampul, Cosmopolitan Indonesia, and Robb Report Singapore.

On 31 May 2022, together with Puteri Indonesia 2022 winners, Laksmi Shari De-Neefe Suardana and Cindy May McGuire, Cresheilla was appointed as the 2022 G20 Ambassador by the President of the Republic of Indonesia, Joko Widodo, at the Merdeka Palace, as part of the Indonesian presidency at the upcoming seventeenth meeting of the Group of Twenty (G20) in Bali.

Pageantry

Puteri Jawa Timur 2015
Cresheilla joined the world of pageantry after she was recommended by Puteri Indonesia 2014, Elvira Devinamira Wirayanti, to join Puteri Jawa Timur 2015, but she failed to win the title.

Puteri Jawa Timur 2022
After a seven year break, Cresheilla participated in Puteri Jawa Timur 2022, winning the title and right to represent Jawa Timur in the national pageant.

Puteri Indonesia 2022

As the winner of Puteri Jawa Timur 2022, Cresheilla represented East Java at Puteri Indonesia 2022, at the Jakarta Convention Center, Jakarta, Indonesia, on 27 May 2022. She was selected as one of the top 10 in the "Personal Branding and Advocacy Challenge" and one of the three winners of "Miss Intelligence", where she received a master's degree scholarship from the IPMI International business school.

During the finale, Cresheilla was asked by Putri Kuswisnuwardhani whether she has any experiences that she would like to change. She answered:

At the end of the event, Cresheilla was crowned as Puteri Indonesia Pariwisata 2022 by the outgoing titleholder, Jihane Almira Chedid of Central Java. Cresheilla was crowned along with her fellow Puteri Indonesia Queens; Laksmi Shari De-Neefe Suardana and Cindy May McGuire.

Miss Supranational 2022
As the winner of Puteri Indonesia Pariwisata 2022, Cresheilla represented Indonesia at Miss Supranational 2022 at the Strzelecki Park Amphitheater in Nowy Sącz, Małopolska, Poland on 15 July 2022.

During the pageant, Cresheilla won the special award of Miss Supra Chat, together with Nguyễn Huỳnh Kim Duyên of Vietnam. At the end of the event, Cresheilla was crowned as the 3rd Runner-up. It was Indonesia's seventh consecutive placement and the fourth time in the top 5 after 2013, 2018, and 2019.

Filmography 
Cresheilla began her acting career in the comedy-romance film titled Jomblo, directed by Setiawan Hanung Bramantyo and produced by SinemArt in 2006. On her debut film, Cresheilla was paired with mega-stars Christian Sugiono, Rianti Cartwright and Nadia Saphira. In 2020, She also joined the Top Model competition, on the Season 1 of Indonesia's Next Top Model, where she finished as the semi-finalist.

Cinema films

Reality shows

References

External links

 Puteri Indonesia Official Website
 Official Miss Supranational Official Website

Living people
1998 births
Puteri Indonesia winners
Miss Supranational contestants
Deakin University alumni
University of Indonesia alumni
Child activists
Education activists
Open access activists
Indonesian human rights activists
Indonesian beauty pageant winners
Indonesian female models
Indonesian activists
Indonesian actresses
Indonesian stage actresses
Indonesian film actresses
Indonesian television actresses
21st-century Indonesian actresses
Indonesian Muslims
People from Surabaya
Javanese people
Minahasa people